Release Me 2 is a compilation album of rare and previously unreleased recordings by American singer Barbra Streisand. Released on CD, vinyl and digital formats on August 6, 2021, it is a follow-up to her 2012 compilation Release Me. 

Sales of Release Me 2 extended Streisand's successful chart history in the U.S., making her the only woman with a top-20 album in each decade since the 1960s.

Promotion
Release Me 2 was initially announced June 2, 2021, followed two days later by the lead single "I'd Want It to Be You", a duet with Willie Nelson. An official lyric video directed by Matt Amato accompanied the single's release.

This was followed by another duet on June 25: "Rainbow Connection" with Kermit the Frog. On July 1, "Sweet Forgiveness" premiered in the U.K. on The Zoe Ball Breakfast Show, then subsequently released to digital platforms.

Zane Lowe joined Streisand at her home to discuss the album; their interview appeared August 4 on YouTube.

Critical reception
BroadwayWorld said, "Streisand displays courage and openness in exploring deep feelings and truly taking them in. Her unforgettable voice tells a story with each lyric and leaves the listener with much to think about long after each song ends."

The Independent wrote, "Release Me 2 contains all the smarts and schmaltz of Babs at her best.... Streisand's voice is one of the most ridiculously luxurious instruments on the planet. A five-star penthouse suite of a voice: plush and spacious, with a solid-gold commitment to the lyrics and a sunken marble bathtub of soft-soapy soul in which to wallow."

Metro Weekly said, "Release Me 2 is a thoughtfully compiled album with a good spread of songs from various points in Streisand's career, hitting most of the beats that a longtime fan would expect to hear.... Apart from a couple of memorable novelties, Release Me 2 is classic Streisand from beginning to end."

Commercial performance 

The album debuted at #10 on the Rolling Stone Top 200 Albums Chart, selling 23,700 units (19.7k pure) in the United States and became the 3rd highest debut of the week. It also debuted at #15 on the Billboard 200 with 22,000 units sold and became the third top-selling album of the week (second by a female artist). Streisand also re-entered Billboard's Artist 100 at #15. On Billboard's Top Current Albums Sales, the album debuted at #2, while on Billboard's Vinyl Album Chart, the album debuted at #5.

Streisand now extends her record for the most top 40-charting albums among women in the history of the chart (54 albums). On top of that, she becomes the only woman with new top 20or even top 40albums in every decade from the 1960s through the 2020s.

In the United Kingdom, the album debuted at #5, becoming her 15th Top 10 album in the country. In its second week, the album fell to number fifteen and number ninety-five in its third week. The album performed moderately elsewhere, peaking inside the Top 20 including Germany, Australia and Switzerland.

Track listing

Charts

Release history

References

External links
Barbra Archives: Release Me 2 (2021)
"I’d Want It to Be You" lyric video with Willie Nelson

2021 compilation albums
Barbra Streisand compilation albums
Columbia Records compilation albums
Sequel albums